The Santa Fe Pacific Corporation was formed as the Santa Fe Southern Pacific Corporation on  by the merger of Santa Fe Industries, which owned the Atchison, Topeka and Santa Fe Railway, with the Southern Pacific Company, which owned the Southern Pacific Railroad.

After the Interstate Commerce Commission denied their plan to merge their railroads as the Southern Pacific Santa Fe Railroad, the holding company name was shortened, and the Southern Pacific Railroad sold.

The holding company retained all the non-rail interests of both predecessors; these were mainly real estate and natural resources, but Southern Pacific had also formed the telephone company known as Sprint, which was sold shortly before the merger. It was initially headquartered in Chicago and later in Schaumburg, Illinois. Former Southern Pacific executive Robert Krebs succeeded Santa Fe head John J. Schmidt as CEO.

Almost immediately after the Southern Pacific was sold, Santa Fe Pacific issued a massive dividend. It was so large that it was considered a return of capital, and financed by issuing a large amount of debt. A few years after that, they spun off most of the company's natural resources interests as Santa Fe Pacific Corporation. They also spun off all their non-track real estate interests, including railway stations, as Catellus Development.

In September 1995 what was left of the company merged into Burlington Northern. The Santa Fe railroad became part of the Burlington Northern Santa Fe. Robert Krebs served as CEO of the merged company, serving until his retirement.

The Santa Fe Pacific Corporation was not related to the Santa Fe Pacific Railroad, which operated from 1897 to 1902.

References

United States railroad holding companies
Atchison, Topeka and Santa Fe Railway
Southern Pacific Railroad
Companies based in Chicago
Schaumburg, Illinois
BNSF Railway